T. africanus may refer to:
 Tridenchthonius africanus, a pseudoscorpion species found in Tanzania
 Turraeanthus africana, a plant species found in Angola, Benin and Cameroon

See also
 Africanus (disambiguation)